is a Multi Platinum songwriter raised in Tokyo. 

Active since 2004, she has worked with many Japanese artists such as Namie Amuro, EXILE, E-girls as well as international artists like BTS (band), Che'Nelle, Twice, Girls' Generation, SHINee, BoA, Red Velvet and LOONA. She has accrued more than 50 Oricon No. #1 hits, including "Crystal Snow" by BTS, and wrote the 5th most searched lyrics of 2015, "Happiness" by  Che'Nelle.

Career
Okajima's early success was as a lyricist, writing lyrics for over 250 songs before she started working as a top-liner in 2012. Her work focuses on genres such as pop, R&B and dance. She is currently signed to Swedish publisher RoastingHouse Music.

References

External links
岡嶋かな多(kanataokajima) on twitter
Kanata Okajima on Instagram

Living people
1984 births
Japanese songwriters
Japanese writers
Swedish songwriters